The minister for intergovernmental relations is a position created by Boris Johnson in the second substantive reshuffle of his second government for Michael Gove who was the newly appointed Secretary of State for Levelling Up. The post was vacant from the 6th July 2022 until the appointment of Nadhim Zahawi on 6th September 2022.

Responsibilities
In the launch of the renamed Department for Levelling Up, Housing and Communities, the Minister for Intergovernmental Relations is described to be spearheading coordination with the Territorial Offices and the devolved administrations on the Prime Minister’s (and Minister for the Union's) behalf.

List of ministers

References

Union
Ministerial offices in the United Kingdom
2021 establishments in the United Kingdom